Wolfe is a British television police procedural drama on Sky Max, created by Paul Abbott. It follows Professor Wolfe Kinteh, a crime scene investigator and academic who solves crimes in Northern England. It stars Babou Ceesay as the titular lead. It began on 10 September 2021.

Cast
Babou Ceesay as Professor Wolfe Kinteh
Natalia Tena as Val Kinteh
Amanda Abbington as Dot
Adam Long as Steve
Shaniqua Okwok as Dominique
Christine Tremarco as DCI Betsy Chambers
Talitha Wing as Flick
Naomi Yang as Maggy

Episodes

Reception
Ed Power of The Telegraph gave it two out five stars, deeming it 'uneven'.

References

External links
 

2021 British television series debuts
2021 British television series endings
2020s British crime drama television series
2020s British mystery television series
2020s British police procedural television series
2020s British television miniseries
Sky UK original programming
English-language television shows